The B. K. Bullard House is a historic house located at 644 South Lakeshore Boulevard in Lake Wales, Florida.

Description and history 
The B.K. Bullard House is a two-story brick residential building located on a large, sloping lot overlooking Lake Wales. The lot is landscaped with palm sand shrubbery throughout. The building has a low-pitched hipped roof with boxed eaves and a central hipped dormer. The roof is covered with ceramic tile.

It was added to the National Register of Historic Places on August 31, 1990.

References

External links

 Polk County listings at National Register of Historic Places
 Polk County listings at Florida's Office of Cultural and Historical Programs

Houses on the National Register of Historic Places in Florida
Buildings and structures in Lake Wales, Florida
National Register of Historic Places in Polk County, Florida
Houses in Polk County, Florida
Colonial Revival architecture in Florida
Houses completed in 1914
1914 establishments in Florida